State Highway 141 (SH-141) is an  state highway in Sequoyah Co., Oklahoma, USA. It connects U.S. Route 59 (US-59) to US-64 and runs through Gans. It has no lettered spur routes.

SH-141 was first added to the state highway system in 1958 as a gravel highway and was gradually paved between then and 1966.

Route description
State Highway 141 begins at US-59 east of Robert S. Kerr Lake, south of Sallisaw. The highway then turns north for about a half mile (0.3 km) before resuming its easterly course. The highway continues east for about  more, passing south of Pine Mountain. The highway then turns northeast to pass through the town of Gans, where it crosses a railroad track. Northeast of town, the road turns to the east once again before coming to an end at US-64.

History
SH-141 first appeared on the 1959 official state map, implying that it was commissioned the previous year. At this time, SH-141 had the same extent as it does today, but was completely gravel, and terminated north of Gans rather than turning back east as it does today. By 1961, the highway had been rerouted to end at its current eastern terminus; the portion of highway east of Gans was also paved at this time. In 1966 the remainder of the highway was paved.

Junction list

References

External links

SH-141 at OKHighways
SH-141 at Roadklahoma
Transportation in Sequoyah County, Oklahoma
141